ASFAR may refer to:

 Americans for a Society Free from Age Restrictions, a youth liberation organization
 ASFAR (football club) (Association Sportive des Forces Armées Royales), a Moroccan sports club

See also
 Asfar or Metzad, an Israeli settlement in the West Bank